Joseph Woodke (born July 12, 1989) is an American ice sled hockey player. He was a member of the United States national team that won gold at the 2022 Winter Paralympics.

Career
Woodke represented the United States at the 2022 Winter Paralympics and won a gold medal.

Personal life
On March 29, 2011, while on foot patrol with the United States Marine Corps in Afghanistan, he stepped on an improvised explosive device. The blast resulted in the loss of both of his legs and damage to his right ear. He spent more than a year and a half at Walter Reed Medical Center recovering.

References 

1999 births
Living people
American sledge hockey players
Paralympic sledge hockey players of the United States
Paralympic gold medalists for the United States
Para ice hockey players at the 2022 Winter Paralympics
Medalists at the 2022 Winter Paralympics
Paralympic medalists in sledge hockey
United States Marine Corps personnel of the War in Afghanistan (2001–2021)
United States Marines